The Algiers Metro is a rapid transit system serving Algiers, the capital of Algeria. The metro has 19 stations and spanning  and moved 28.4 million passengers in 2016. 

The first phase of Line 1, "Haï El Badr"–"Tafourah-Central Post Office", which spanned  and 10 stations, opened for public service on 1 November 2011. A  extension from "Haï El Badr" to "El Harrach Centre" opened for commercial service on 4 July 2015 after test runs in June. the last expansion was on April 10, 2018 after test runs in January.

Stations

Stations Under Construction
There are 13 stations currently under construction in the Algiers Metro.

References

Algiers
Railway stations in Algeria
2011 establishments in Algeria